The Alabama Mr. Football Award is, as in other states, an honor given to the top high school football player in the state of Alabama; it is awarded by a panel of sports writers.

List of the Alabama Sports Writers Association’s Mr. Football Award Winners

References

Alabama High School Athletic Association site
Alabama High School Football Historical Society site

Mr. Football awards
American football in Alabama